Steven L. Herman is a journalist and author, and, Voice of America's chief national correspondent.  From 2017 through 2021, Herman was senior White House correspondent and subsequently VOA's White House bureau chief.

Career
Herman was one of the few journalists to spend time in the Fukushima I Nuclear Power Plant "hot zone" and visit the grounds of the crippled facility in April 2011.

Herman served a term as Presidents of the Foreign Correspondents' Club of Japan (FCCJ) and the Seoul Foreign Correspondents' Club.

Herman served on the advisory board of the Waseda Marketing Forum, associated with the Business School of Waseda University in Tokyo.

Herman is the author of a pictorial book, Bhutan in Color 2007: A Himalayan Kingdom through the Lens of an American Journalist.

As part of the December 15, 2022 Twitter suspensions, Herman's Twitter account was temporarily suspended.

References

External links
  on the Fediverse

American reporters and correspondents
Living people
21st-century American journalists
University of Nevada, Las Vegas alumni
1959 births
Thomas Edison State University alumni
Voice of America people